MedAccess is a social finance company based in London. It is capitalized with $200 million, enabling it to provide loans and financial guarantees designed to increase access to health products, including vaccines, therapeutics, and diagnostic tests, for patients in low- and middle-income countries.

 In return for guaranteed sales, manufacturers provide long-term price reductions and assurances of supply security. MedAccess’ guarantees also aim to strengthen markets. Patients benefit from lower costs and more availability as new manufacturers enter the markets while existing manufacturers reduce their prices to compete for market share.

The company had provided nine guarantees by the end of 2022. The guarantees support access to health products that tackle COVID-19, HIV, malaria, syphilis, and tuberculosis, particularly in Africa and South Asia.

History 
The early 2000s saw renewed global focus on improving access to lifesaving health products. New financing mechanisms such as Gavi, the Vaccine Alliance, the Global Fund to fight AIDS, Tuberculosis and Malaria, and Unitaid increased access to products against major killer diseases like HIV and childhood pneumonia.

Although these organizations succeeded in increasing access to products in many countries, market failures continued to hamper efforts to scale up access to a broader range of healthcare products around the world. The Department for International Development, with design inputs from the Bill & Melinda Gates Foundation and the Clinton Health Access Initiative, developed initial concepts for a new capital fund to support market shaping activities. The UK's then-CDC Group (now British International Investment) incubated the concepts and developed a company limited by shares.

MedAccess was founded as the Credit Facility for Access to Medicines in November 2017. BII provided initial paid-in capital of $200 million (over two tranches) and remains the company’s sole shareholder. MedAccess is part of BII’s Catalyst Strategies, which accept greater risks in return for higher development impact.

Michael Anderson was appointed CEO in November 2017. Anderson, a former director-general at DFID and CEO of the Children’s Investment Fund Foundation, had previously served as the UK Prime Minister’s envoy for the creation of the UN Sustainable Development Goals.

The company changed its name to MedAccess Guarantee Ltd in 2018. It is not-for-profit, with all surpluses from capital investments and fees reinvested into its transaction pipeline.

Transactions

Innovative finance tools 
MedAccess uses innovative finance tools to immediately increase access to health products and shape markets in the longer term. Guarantees are approved by an investment committee based on needs assessments, impact analysis and partner alignment.

Volume guarantees 
A volume guarantee is a legally binding contract that sets out a maximum price in return for assured sales volumes. It provides procurers with confidence that sufficient supply of the product will be available at a ceiling price, while providing manufacturers with assurance that they will not suffer losses should sales volumes not meet anticipated demand.

If product sales are less than the agreed upon target, MedAccess will either purchase the shortfall volume or make a payment to the supplier to compensate for losses due to the shortfall.

Procurement guarantees 
Procurement guarantees enable procurers to enter into purchasing agreements that would otherwise have been out of reach due to individual organizations’ procurement and disbursement rules.

MedAccess enters into an agreement with a procurer to support its procurement or market shaping activity. A call can be made by the procurer if there is a shortfall in demand for the product or products covered by the guarantee.

Purchasers benefit from the terms agreed upon by the procurers and the manufacturers in the form of improved value for money, reduced lag time, and quality assurance on purchased products. Patients benefit from faster and wider availability of affordable high-quality health commodities.

Loans and loan guarantees 
In May 2021, the MedAccess Board agreed to expand the company’s mandate to include loans, working capital and loan guarantees.

Development impact 
MedAccess uses a bespoke development impact framework to assess the impact of its transactions. The company uses the tool to calculate potential additional impact compared to the current standard of care in terms of lives changed, money saved, and markets shaped.

In its 2021 Annual Report, MedAccess reported its guarantees contributed to:

 554,000 people living with HIV who were not virally suppressed knowing their viral load after being tested using the Panther platform
 8.6 million cases of malaria being averted over the lifetime of Interceptor G2 mosquito nets provided through the BASF guarantee
 101,000 additional people living with HIV completing 3HP treatment for latent TB 
 Procurement and distribution of more than 75 million vaccines through UNICEF, including COVID-19 vaccines and other vaccines against serious childhood illnesses

MedAccess projects that its guarantee for SD Biosensor’s dual rapid diagnostic test for HIV and syphilis will lead to at least 285,000 pregnant women receiving a syphilis diagnosis and 51,500 miscarriages and stillbirths being avoided. It also projects that its HIV self test agreement will lead to an additional 8.1 million people being tested for HIV.

In November 2022, MedAccess estimated that guarantees provided in its first five years have enabled healthcare products to reach more than 375 million people in more than 90 countries.

Impact of COVID-19 
Global health organizations including the Global Fund have reported COVID-19 reversed decades of gains against diseases such as HIV, TB and malaria. MedAccess’ guarantees helped to ensure essential healthcare products continued to be available and the company reported minimal disruptions to supply in its 2020 Annual Report.

See also 
 Foreign, Commonwealth and Development Office
 British International Investment
 Clinton Health Access Initiative
 Gavi, the Vaccine Alliance
 Bill & Melinda Gates Foundation
 Unitaid
 Innovative Vector Control Consortium

References 

Social finance